The Kawasaki Ninja ZX-10R is a motorcycle in the Ninja sport bike series from the Japanese manufacturer Kawasaki,  the successor to the Ninja ZX-9R. It was originally released in 2004 and has been updated and revised throughout the years. It combines an ultra-narrow chassis, low weight, and radial brakes. In 2004 and 2005 the ZX-10R won Best Superbike from Cycle World magazine, and the international Masterbike competition.

Components

Engine
Kawasaki engineers used a stacked design for a liquid-cooled,  inline four-cylinder engine. The crankshaft axis, input shaft, and output shaft of the Ninja ZX-10R engine are positioned in a triangular layout to reduce engine length, while the high-speed generator is placed behind the cylinder bank to reduce engine width. The DOHC are machined from Chromoly steel, built for strength; four valves per cylinder improve high-rpm breathing; and the forged, lightweight pistons offer high heat resistance to further enhance the bike's power-to-weight ratio.

Cooling system
In addition to liquid cooling, the ZX-10R engine has an oil cooler adjacent to the oil filter to reduce oil temperatures. Slosh analysis was also used to design the internal structure of the oil pan, thereby reducing windage losses and helping to maintain low oil temperatures.

Clutch
A multi-plate wet slipper clutch transfers power to a six-speed, close-ratio transmission ideal for closed-course competition. The back-torque limiter automatically disengages the clutch (partially) under hard downshifting at high engine speeds to prevent rear-wheel hop during corner entry.

Wheels
A new six-spoke wheel design is claimed to be almost as light as special purpose race wheels. Since the 2006 model, the sidewall profile of the rear tire has been increased from 190/50/ZR17 to 190/55/ZR17.

History

2004–2005
The 2004 model was the debut of the Ninja ZX-10R with minor updates in 2005. It was compact, and with a chassis rivaling those of a 600cc sportbike and with a short wheelbase and a high power-to-weight ratio, which helped the handling. The exhaust system was fully titanium with a single muffler.

2006–2007

Among other changes, the 2006 model had twin underseat exhausts which contributed to a  increase in dry weight. The engine remained largely unchanged.

2008

The ZX-10R was all new for its launch for the 2008 model year. There was a dramatic change in appearance with the bike with a much more angular front end. Kawasaki moved away from the twin underseat exhausts of the 2006–2007 model to a more conventional single side exhaust. The compression ratio of the engine was raised.

2009

The 2009 model received only slight changes to the transmission from the 2008 model. The shift shaft was upgraded to allow smoother shifts.

2010

The 2010 model received slight changes from the 2009 model, including, upgraded Öhlins steering damper, headlights were recessed into the fairing and the individual fairing centre section pieces where now fused into one moulding.

2011–2015

The 2011 ZX-10R underwent a major overhaul both mechanically and visually. Most notably, Kawasaki introduced their Sport Kawasaki Traction Control (S-KTRC) system as standard. It predicts when traction will be lost and adapts accordingly. Also new are an ABS option called Kawasaki Intelligent Braking System (KIBS), a completely new design, adjustable foot-pegs, larger throttle bodies, a horizontal rear suspension, lighter three-spoke wheels, Showa Big Piston Fork (BPF) front suspension, and an LCD panel dashboard. The 2012 model is identical to the 2011. In the 2013 models, the front damper was replaced with an Ohlins electronic front steering dampener.

Tom Sykes in 2013 became the first Superbike World Champion for Kawasaki since Scott Russell and the first on a ZX-10R. Stuart Easton won the 2014 Macau Grand Prix. Jonathan Rea won the 2015 Superbike World Championship season. Jeremy Toye holds the Heavyweight (Open) lap record at the Pikes Peak International Hill Climb.

2016

The 2016 ZX-10R received a major update. With a claimed 197 hp with ram-air intake at 13,000 rpm. The electronics now use a Bosch five-axis Internal Measurement Unit (IMU). A sixth degree is calculated by proprietary Kawasaki software. The S-KTRC updated with an added launch control mode, a quickshifter, and engine brake control. Also, optional smarter KIBS cornering ABS. Because of its predictive as opposed to reactive nature, Kawasaki touts this system of S-KTRC as the most advanced of all current traction control systems. Some of the changes mechanically that are now lighter are the slipper clutch, balancer, crankshaft as well as pistons. A less restrictive air filter and larger air box as well as a lighter less restrictive exhaust system. A new transmission that is cassette style is vertically stacked. The previous petal rotors that have been in use since 2004 are now replaced with circular rotors. The calipers are now Brembo M50 Monoblock and the master cylinder is a radial Brembo. The brake lines are now braided stainless-steel. A first for production sport bikes a 43 mm Showa Balance Free Fork derived from WSBK. Kawasaki also offers Race Kit parts for chassis and engine.

2017
Kawasaki released a homologation special, the ZX-10RR with the modified cylinder head. Race-kit parts can be ordered such as high lift cams, DLC coated valve train, a beefed-up crankcase, Marchesini seven-spoke forged aluminum rims, a bi-directional quickshifter, and a single seat. The model was a limited-run of 500 units.

2018–2019
For the 2018 race season, Kawasaki adopted the motto "Ninja Spirit" due to race organisers imposing technical penalties based on Kawasaki's analysed prior successes, resulting in limitations to the maximum revs their engine could achieve in race operation. Kawasaki asserted the new rules would affect their machines more than the other manufacturers, resulting in their reaction: "The spirit of accepting a challenge of striving for on-track excellence, and never giving up.".

In late 2018 Kawasaki released a homologation special run of 500 ZX-10RR machines having a redesigned engine with modifications including finger cam followers that allowed for higher revs and greater power output. This was used by World Superbike riders Jonathan Rea and Leon Haslam during 2019.

2020
Production of the 2020 model year ZX-10R benefited from racing experience, having piston and cylinder head components previously available only on the ZX-10RR.

Specifications

Notes

References

 Kawasaki ZX-10R Road tests of all Kawasaki ZX-10R models
 Motorcycle USA 2011 Kawasaki Ninja ZX-10R First Ride

External links

 (United States)

Ninja ZX-10R
Sport bikes
Motorcycles introduced in 2004